Northern Khmer may refer to:
Northern Khmer people, ethnic Khmer inhabiting the Surin, Sisaket and Buriram Provinces of Thailand, as well as part of Nakhon Ratchasima Province
Northern Khmer dialect